The Collection is the first compilation album by saxophonist Kenny G, released by BMG in 1990.

Track listing
"Songbird"
"Tradewinds"
"Silhouette"
"Don't Make Me Wait for Love (Live)"
"Midnight Motion"
"Against Doctor's Orders"
"Going Home"
"What Does It Take (To Win Your Love)"
"Pastel"
"Uncle Al"
"We've Saved the Best for Last"
"Last Night of the Year"
"You Make Me Believe"
"Let Go"

Certifications

References

Kenny G compilation albums
1993 compilation albums